The People's Party was a political party in South Korea.

Electoral results

President

Legislature

References

1963 establishments in South Korea
1964 disestablishments in South Korea
Democratic parties in South Korea
Political parties established in 1963
Political parties disestablished in 1964
Defunct political parties in South Korea